Stigmella egonokii is a moth of the family Nepticulidae. It is only known from Kyushu in Japan.

Adults of the first generation are on wing from the end of April. Second-generation larvae appear in late June, the third-generation larvae in late September to late October. There are two to three generations per year.

The larvae feed on Styrax japonica. They mine the leaves of their host plant. The mine is linear, slender and located on the upper-surface of the leaf. It is sometimes restricted by the mid-rib or a lateral vein. It is pale greenish brown to pale brown and filled with greenish brown to dark brown grains of frass.

External links
Japanese Species Of The Genus Stigmella (Nepticulidae: Lepidoptera)

Nepticulidae
Moths of Japan
Moths described in 1985